Israel Fernández (born 1989) is a Spanish Romani flamenco singer.

Biography 
Fernández was born into a Romani family in Corral de Almaguer, Toledo. At an early age, his family instilled in him an interest in flamenco. He began to participate in musical television competitions and at the age of 18 he recorded his first album.

In November 2021, Fernández performed Fiesta (Bulería) on A COLORS SHOW. His album Amor was nominated for Best Flamenco Album at the 22nd Annual Latin Grammy Awards.

Fernández works jointly with renowned guitarist Diego del Morao on most of his songs.

Discography

Albums 

 2008: Naranjas Sobre la Nieve
 2014: Con Hilo De Oro Fino
 2018: Universo Pastora
 2020: Amor

References 

1989 births
Living people
Flamenco singers
Romani singers
21st-century Spanish male singers
21st-century Spanish singers
People from the Province of Toledo